Beirut Knights is a book by the author Jasmina Najjar that was published in December 2013 in English. It is a series of humorous short stories about real-life Lebanese dating disasters.

Through Author's Eyes 
In an article that appeared in the press, the author, Jasmina Najjar, explains that there's great pressure to get married in Lebanon. The stories in Beirut Knights are told through the main character, Nadia, who was raised in London, and her friends who from come from different backgrounds and walks of life. This resulted in stories from different perspectives. While written to entertain through its tales of dating disasters, Beirut Knights also touches upon certain elements of Lebanese society and sociocultural issues in a light manner.

Reception 
The book received mainly positive reviews including Al Arabiya News "It’s NOT Love, Actually: book pokes fun at Lebanon dating disasters", L'Orient Le Jour "Les plus belles histoires de rendez-vous... foireux", and l'Hebdo Magazine "Beirut Knights, de Jasmina Najjar. Des princes libanais? Pas très charmants".

It was also mentioned on popular Lebanese blogs, including Blog Baladi and Aishti Blog.

What Came Next 
Beirut Knights led to an article in Executive Magazine about being single in Lebanon and a TEDxLAU talk.

References 

2013 non-fiction books
Dating
Books about Lebanon